The 2002 WNBA draft was the first to implement a lottery that arranges the order of the first four overall picks. The lottery gave four teams with the identically worst record of 10–22 from the 2001 season an equal chance to own the first overall selection, which the Seattle Storm did.

Four of the top six draft picks, Sue Bird (#1), Swin Cash (#2), Asjha Jones (#4) and Tamika (Williams) Raymond (#6) were from the same team, the 2002 NCAA champion University of Connecticut.

Key

Draft selections

Round 1

Round 2

Round 3

Round 4

UConn Fab Four
Connecticut Huskies players Tamika Williams, Sue Bird, Asjha Jones and Swin Cash were all selected in the first round of the draft. Each player had immediate impacts with their 2002 WNBA Teams. Cash, Bird and Williams accounted for 21.3, 19.9 and 17.3 percent, respectively, of their teams’ total points, rebounds and assists. Jones, a reserve, posted 8.8 percent of the Mystics' total output in those three key categories.

References

WNBA Draft: Pick-by-pick at ESPN.com

Women's National Basketball Association Draft
Draft